Nityanand Saha (2 March 1933 – 3 August 1955) was an Indian revolutionary from West Bengal, known mainly for his involvement in the Satyagraha movement against the Portuguese government, to free Goa from Portuguese rule, under leader Ram Lohia. He was an active member of Janata Seva Sangh in Payradanga, Nadia, West Bengal, and on 13 August 1955, he was shot dead by the Portuguese government, along with his associates Baburao Thorat and Karnail Singh.

Early life and career 
Nityanand Saha was born on 2 March 1933 in Porabari village, Tangail district of Bangladesh. He received his education at Thatya Jaburi college, and passed his matriculation exam in 1949. After the partition of India, he left his homeland and settled in Preetinagar division of Payradanga. He joined the Janata Seva Sangh of Payradanga at a young age, under Kitish Mohan Babu.

Death
He always wanted to be a martyr for his country's freedom, but after India became independent in 1947, he left his hope to be a martyr. He was inspired by Mahatma Gandhi's non violence ideas and his determination to do something for his country. He joined the Satyagraha movement of Goa in 1955 to fight against the fascism of the Portuguese government in Goa. Many satyagrahis came from other parts of India to join the Goa independence movement. On 13 August 1955, a non-violent satyagraha movement started by Nityanand, with two of his associates, Baburao Thorat of Maharastra, and Karnail Singh of Punjab. But the Portuguese police couldn't tolerate this movement and shot the three of them: Nityanand, Karnail Singh and Baburao Thorat. Nityanand succumbed to his injuries, and on the same day, 13 August 1955, he died in Vengurla Hospital, Goa.

Legacy
The Paryadanga Smriti Sangh built a memorial in his memory in 1994, near the Payradanga railway station, which still stands today. Portuguese Church Street in Kolkata was renamed as Saheed Nityananda Saha Sarani.

References

 
 
Indian nationalists
Indian revolutionaries
1933 births
1955 deaths
Deaths by firearm in India
Protest-related deaths